Trogoxylon is a genus of beetles in the family Bostrichidae. They are members of the subfamily Lyctinae, the powderpost beetles.

Species include:
Trogoxylon aequale
Trogoxylon angulicollis	 
Trogoxylon auriculatum
Trogoxylon caseyi
Trogoxylon giacobbii
Trogoxylon impressum	 
Trogoxylon ingae
Trogoxylon parallelipipedum
Trogoxylon praeustum
Trogoxylon punctatum
Trogoxylon punctipenne
Trogoxylon rectangulum
Trogoxylon recticolle	 
Trogoxylon spinifrons
Trogoxylon ypsilon

References

External links
Trogoxylon at Fauna Europaea

Bostrichidae